Gustavo "El Tigrillo" (English: Ocelot) Yacamán Aristizabal (born February 25, 1991) is a Colombian racing driver from Santiago de Cali. Yacamán began his career in open-wheel racing, but switched to sports car endurance racing in 2012. He raced in the US until he joined G-Drive Racing in 2015, where he drove a Ligier in the WEC Championship and finished that season 3rd in the LMP2 class. In 2016 Yacamán switched to a sprint format, driving for BMW Team Teo Martín in the International GT Open series. He finished runner-up for the 2016 Championship.

Racing career

Early career
After winning the American Stars of Karting competition in 2005, he moved immediately to the Spanish Formula Three Championship for the 2006 season, a significant jump for a young driver. He finished 16th in the championship. He also competed in Master Junior Formula in Europe and finished 4th. The following year Yacamán captured his first win and finished 8th in Spanish Formula Three. In 2008, he captured another win and finished 9th in Spanish F3.

Indy Lights
For 2009, he returned to the U.S. to race in the Firestone Indy Lights Series with Sam Schmidt Motorsports. He finished 12th in points with a best finish of 4th at the Milwaukee Mile. He returned to the series in 2010 with the rookie team Cape Motorsports with Wayne Taylor Racing. Yacamán improved to 10th in points and captured his first podium finish with a 3rd place at Toronto. He returned to the series in 2011 for a third season, this time with Team Moore Racing. He captured his first win late in the season at Baltimore and finished fourth in points. Yacamán achieved his first Indy Lights pole position at the 2012 Firestone Freedom 100. He finished the season third in points with two wins (at Detroit and Toronto) and three runner-up finishes.

Sports cars
For 2013 Yacamán moved to sports car racing after having raced in the 24 Hours of Daytona the previous year, driving the #6 Ford-Riley Daytona Prototype entry for Michael Shank Racing in the Rolex Sports Car Series.  Yacaman caused a great deal of controversy during the 2013 race at Detroit's Belle Isle.  On the first lap of the race Yacaman was trying to make a move inside of Memo Rojas but ran wide, pushing Rojas' car off-line and into a concrete barrier.  The incident caused significant damage to Rojas' car, and also collected Yacaman's teammate John Pew.  As a result of the incident Rojas and His teammate Scott Pruett did not accrue any points for the race which put them at a severe disadvantage for the Championship. In the course of the season, Yacamán managed a best finish of second place at Lime Rock, to finish eleventh in the championship.

For 2014 Yacamán has joined the newly unified United SportsCar Championship with OAK Racing; first with a Morgan LMP2-Nissan and then with a Ligier JS P2-Honda, managed to win at Mosport Park, and three podiums, so that ended eighth in the drivers' championship Prototype class.

Yacamán became a junior Lamborghini factory driver in 2017, and will compete at the Blancpain GT Series for Team Lazarus.

Racing record

American open–wheel racing results 
(key)

Indy Lights

WeatherTech SportsCar Championship results
(key)(Races in bold indicate pole position, Results are overall/class)

24 Hours of Le Mans results

Complete FIA World Endurance Championship results

Complete Blancpain GT Series Sprint Cup results

* Season still in progress.

Complete Global Rallycross Championship results
(key)

GRC Lites

References

External links

 
 

1991 births
Living people
People from Cali
Colombian racing drivers
Euroformula Open Championship drivers
Indy Lights drivers
24 Hours of Le Mans drivers
24 Hours of Daytona drivers
Rolex Sports Car Series drivers
WeatherTech SportsCar Championship drivers
European Le Mans Series drivers
FIA World Endurance Championship drivers
International GT Open drivers
Arrow McLaren SP drivers
Wayne Taylor Racing drivers
Team Moore Racing drivers
OAK Racing drivers
AFS Racing drivers
G-Drive Racing drivers
Team Lazarus drivers
Global RallyCross Championship drivers
Teo Martín Motorsport drivers
De Villota Motorsport drivers
Larbre Compétition drivers
Starworks Motorsport drivers
Graff Racing drivers
Meyer Shank Racing drivers